Nissan Korea Co., Ltd. was the South Korean arm of Japanese automaker Nissan that specialized in the sales and distribution of Nissan and Infiniti automobiles in South Korea.

History
Nissan Korea was established in February 2004. Considering the market situation and customer preferences, in July 2005, the Infiniti brand was launched in South Korea and car sales started. After that, Nissan Korea decided to launch the Nissan brand in November 2008. In April 2015, Infiniti Korea Co., Ltd. was established, thus separating Infiniti brand from Nissan Korea.

In mid-2020, Nissan announced it would exit the South Korean car market. They announced that the Infiniti brand would be pulled out from South Korea as well alongside the Nissan brand by December due to worsening business environment amidst the COVID-19 pandemic in South Korea and the 2019 boycott of Japanese products in South Korea. Nissan announced that service centers will be managed to provide after-sales services such as vehicle quality assurance and parts management for eight years.

References

External links

Nissan
Automotive companies of South Korea
Companies based in Seoul
Vehicle manufacturing companies established in 2004
South Korean companies established in 2004
Vehicle manufacturing companies disestablished in 2020
2020 disestablishments in South Korea
South Korean subsidiaries of foreign companies